Guy Smith (born January 2, 1950) is a Canadian former professional ice hockey player.

Early life 
Smith was born in Ottawa. He played minor ice hockey in Brantford, Ontario, and participated in the 1962 Quebec International Pee-Wee Hockey Tournament with the Six Nations of the Grand River youth team. Smith attended the University of New Hampshire, where he played four seasons of NCAA Division I ice hockey as a standout player with the New Hampshire Wildcats men's ice hockey team.

Career 
During the 1972–73 and 1973–74 WHA seasons, Smith played 38 regular season and 11 playoff games with the New England Whalers of the World Hockey Association.

The Guy Smith Award is presented annually to the team's best offensive player.

Awards and honours

References

External links

1950 births
Living people
Brantford Alexanders players
Canadian ice hockey left wingers
Jacksonville Barons players
New England Whalers players
New Hampshire Wildcats men's ice hockey players
Ottawa 67's players
Ice hockey people from Ottawa